Patrick Joseph Hasty (17 March 1934 – August 2000) was a Northern Irish footballer who represented Great Britain at the 1960 Summer Olympics. Hasty played as a centre forward for Tooting & Mitcham United, Leyton Orient, Queens Park Rangers, Aldershot and Guildford City. On debut for Tooting & Mitcham United he scored four goals against Barnet in a 7–2 win.

References

1934 births
2000 deaths
Association footballers from Belfast
Association footballers from Northern Ireland
Leyton Orient F.C. players
Queens Park Rangers F.C. players
Aldershot F.C. players
Guildford City F.C. players
English Football League players
Footballers at the 1960 Summer Olympics
Olympic footballers of Great Britain
Tooting & Mitcham United F.C. players
Northern Ireland amateur international footballers
Association football forwards